A documentary channel is a specialty channel which focuses on broadcasting documentaries. Some documentary channels further specialize by dedicating their television programming to specific types of documentaries or documentaries in a specific area of knowledge.  Documentary and The History Channel are  examples of this. There is some overlap between news channels and documentary channels, but while a documentary channel may also broadcast programs about current affairs, it will, as a rule, air longer, more in-depth segments and not present up-to-the-minute news coverage. Also, many other TV channels regularly air documentaries, but unless a channel is significantly dedicated to documentary-type programming, it probably will not be considered a documentary channel. As of 2006, some of the most famous documentary channels are the Discovery Channel and the National Geographic Channel.

See also
List of documentary television channels